Damian Falisiewicz (born 16 July 1987) is a Polish footballer who plays as a defender.  He formerly played for Motor Lublin,  Flota Świnoujście, and Chełmianka Chełm.

Career
Falisiewicz started his playing career in Motor Lublin, and he made his professional debut on 28 July 2007 in a 0–0 home draw against Tur Turek, coming on as a substitute in the 65th minute. In July 2010, he signed a contract with Flota Świnoujście. After one season, he moved back to Motor. Falisiewicz became Motor's new captain in March 2016.

In February 2017, he signed a contract with Chełmianka Chełm. Ahead of 2017–18 season, he signed a contract with Stal Kraśnik.

Statistics

References

External links
 

Living people
1987 births
Polish footballers
Association football midfielders
Motor Lublin players
Flota Świnoujście players
Chełmianka Chełm players
Stal Kraśnik players
Sportspeople from Lublin